Senate elections were held in Cambodia were held on 29 January 2012, with all 57 seats in the Senate being contested. The result was a victory for the ruling Cambodian People's Party, which won 46 of the 57 seats. The Sam Rainsy Party gain a net of eleven seats, ending with a total of 11 seats. The royalist FUNCINPEC lost all of its nine seats.

Results

List of senators

References

Cambodia
Elections in Cambodia
Senate